Albrecht Abraham Schuch (born 21 August 1985) is a German actor. He is the recipient of several accolades, including three German Film Awards, a Bavarian Film Award, and a German Television Award. He has been nominated for a BAFTA Award for Best Actor in a Supporting Role for his performance in All Quiet on the Western Front (2022).

Early life
Schuch was born in 1985 in Jena, East Germany. He is the younger brother of actress Karoline Schuch. He studied acting at the University of Music and Theatre Leipzig from 2006 to 2010.

Career
Schuch made his film debut in Robert Thalheim's Westwind. In 2012, he played his first film starring role as Alexander von Humboldt in Detlev Buck's Measuring the World based on Daniel Kehlmann's novel of the same name.

He is the only actor to win the German Film Award in two categories as lead and supporting actor at the same award ceremony. In 2020, he won both awards for the films System Crasher and Berlin Alexanderplatz. Two years later, he won again as Best Actor for the Film Dear Thomas.

Filmography

References

External links
 

1985 births
Living people
Actors from Jena
People from Bezirk Gera
German male film actors
German male television actors
21st-century German male actors